Sugar Sugar Rune is a 2005 Japanese anime television series based on Moyoco Anno's award-winning manga series of the same name. The animated series was produced by Studio Pierrot under the direction of Matsushita Yukihiro and consists of fifty-one episodes. Scripts were composed by Reiko Yoshida while the musical score was supervised by Yasuharu Konishi.  The series was first broadcast on TV Tokyo in Japan between July 2, 2005 and June 24, 2006.

Three pieces of theme music are used—one opening theme and two closing themes.



Episode list

References 

Sugar Sugar Rune